Georgia Evans (born 29 January 1997) is a Welsh Rugby Union player who plays second row for the Wales women's national rugby union team and Saracens. She made her debut for the Wales national squad in 2020 and represented them at the 2021 Women's Six Nations Championship.

Club career 
Evans first became interested in rugby at the age of 16, while she was studying at Yeovil College in Somerset. After moving to Wales in 2014, Evans played with Ynysbwl Ladies for two seasons, before joining the Pontyclun Falcons in 2017. In 2020, Evans signed with her current club, Saracens.

International career 
After appearing twice during the 2019 Autumn Internationals, Evans made her Six Nations debut for Wales in 2020. She has won eleven caps during her career to date. She was selected in Wales squad for the 2021 Rugby World Cup in New Zealand.

Personal life 
Evans' cousin, Ceri Sweeney, is a former Wales men fly-half who won 35 caps during the course of his career. Her younger brother, Kyle Evans, plays flanker for Pontypridd RFC.

Evans has a master's degree in strength and conditioning from the University of South Wales.

References

External links 

 

1997 births
Living people
Welsh rugby union players